The Makhonjwa Mountains are a range of small mountains and hills that covers an area of , about 80% in Mpumalanga, a province of South Africa, and the remainder in neighbouring Eswatini. It constitutes 40% of the Barberton Greenstone Belt.

Geography
It has a number of rocky hills, with moist grassy uplands and forested valleys. The region lies within the Barberton centre of endemism.

Geology
The mountains lie on the eastern edge of the Kaapvaal Craton. The range is best known for having some of the oldest exposed rocks on Earth, estimated to be between 3.2 and 3.6 billion years (Ga) old, dating from the Paleoarchean. The mountain range's extreme age and exceptional preservation have yielded some of the oldest undisputed signs of life on Earth and provide insight into the hostile nature of the Precambrian environment under which this life evolved.  This has led to the area being otherwise known as the "Genesis of life".

The range is also known for its gold deposits and a number of komatiites, an unusual type of ultramafic volcanic rock named after the Komati River that flows through the belt.

In April 2014, scientists reported finding evidence of the largest terrestrial meteor impact event to date near the area. The crater from this event, if it still exists, has not yet been found. In May 2019, extraterrestrial organic materials in 3.3-billion-year-old volcanic rocks was found at Makhonjwa Mountains.

History
Swazis and other pastoral peoples probably grazed their livestock there, but not in large numbers, until the arrival of European settlers in the 1860s. Gold was discovered near Kaapsehoop in 1875, but it was the find by George Barber and his cousins Fred and Harry Barber that triggered a gold rush in 1884, leading to the founding of the town of Barberton. It was later overshadowed by the 1886 Witwatersrand Gold Rush.

Economically speaking, mining is declining, and the main activities are now timber harvesting and grazing. Commercial plantations grow pine and eucalyptus.

In 2009, a submission was made for the region's classification as a World Heritage Site. The location became a World Heritage Site in 2018.

References

Geology of South Africa
Mountain ranges of South Africa
Landforms of Mpumalanga
World Heritage Sites in South Africa
Mountains of Eswatini